Alumni of Ipswich Grammar School in Ipswich, Queensland, Australia are known as 'Old Boys' and automatically gain membership into the schools alumni association, the IGS Old Boys Association (IGSOBA). Established in 1907, IGSOBA organises regular reunions and occasional sporting competitions.

Some notable Old Boys of Ipswich Grammar School include:

Academic
Alfred Paxton Backhouse, judge and Deputy-Chancellor of Sydney University, son of the architect, Benjamin Backhouse who designed some of the school buildings
Walter Heywood Bryan - Professor of Geology, University of Queensland and first Doctor of Science at UQ. (1910)
Frederick William Whitehouse-Associate Professor of Geology at University of Queensland and first person from Queensland to take a PhD at the University of Cambridge. (1918)

Architecture, building and engineering
Dr John Bradfield - Engineer famous for designing the Sydney Harbour Bridge and the Story Bridge; Developed the Bradfield Scheme for diverting rivers west of the Great Dividing Range

Entertainment, media and the arts
John Birmingham – Author, best known for He Died With A Felafel In His Hand
Charles Chauvel – Pioneer of the Australian film industry; Influential early film director; Credits include Jedda (first colour feature film made in Australia), In The Wake Of The Bounty, 40,000 Horsemen and The Rats Of Tobruk
Hugh Cornish, television executive
David McCormack – Lead singer of the band Custard
George Miller – Hollywood director, screenwriter and producer. Credits include Mad Max, Babe, Babe: Pig in the City, Lorenzo's Oil and The Witches of Eastwick
Pacharo Mzembe - Actor, Underbelly: Razor
Vance Palmer - Eminent Australian novelist, dramatist, essayist and critic; the Vance Palmer Literary Prize is presented annually at IGS
Percy Savage, fashion publicist, designer, artist, raconteur and bon viveur.
Thomas Shapcott - Writer and poet; Former Professor of Creative Writing at University of Adelaide; Current Fellow at the National Library of Australia

Military
Lt. Gen. John Coates AC MBE - Commandant of the Royal Military College, Duntroon; Head of the Australian Defence Staff, Washington and Chief of the General Staff, Australian Army
Walde Fisher, Australian Infantry Soldier killed in action in World War I
Major Percival Savage DSO MBE - Gallipoli veteran, farmer, chairman of the Committee of Direction of Fruit Marketing, Queensland for 30 years.

Politics, public service and the law
Charles Booker - former member for Wide Bay and Maryborough in the Queensland Legislative Assembly.
Sir Llewellyn Edwards  – Former State Liberal Party leader; Deputy Premier and Treasurer of Queensland; Chairman and Chief Executive for World Expo '88; Former Chancellor of the University of Queensland
Sir Harry Gibbs – Chief Justice of the High Court of Australia; Puisne judge of the High Court of Australia
Norm Jensen - Member of the First Australian Capital Territory Legislative Assembly - 1989 to 1991.
Peter Slipper – Former federal member for the electorate of Fisher and Speaker of the House of Representatives
Thomas Welsby - Member of the Queensland Legislative Assembly
Jon Krause - Member for Beaudesert in the Queensland Legislative Assembly
Sam O'Connor - Member for Bonney in the Queensland Legislative Assembly
Paul Scarr - Senator for Queensland in the Australian Senate
Garth Hamilton - Member for Groom in the Australian House of Representatives

Medicine and science
Raymond Dart - Anatomist and anthropologist best known for his controversial discovery of the Taung Child, or Australopithecus africanus
Major John Lockhart Gibson - One of Queensland's most notable doctors of the early twentieth century

Sport

Basketball
Matt Hodgson - professional basketball player

Cricket
Cameron Gannon - cricketer for Queensland
Craig McDermott - Australian Test cricketer
Francis Ramsay - cricketer for Queensland
Nathan Reardon - cricketer for Queensland
Mark Steketee- cricketer for Queensland
Shane Watson - Australian Test and One Day Vice Captain

Rugby League
Kirisome Auva'a - Paramatta Eels
Dud Beattie - Australian Kangaroos
Willie Carne - Brisbane Broncos, Queensland, Australia; also played Rugby Union for the Queensland Reds
Johnny Hunt - Australian Kangaroos
Ryan Kelley - East Tigers
Martin Kennedy - Sydney Roosters
Brett Plowman - Brisbane Broncos
Craig Polla-Mounter - Canterbury-Bankstown Bulldogs
Junior Sau - Newcastle Knights
Lagi Setu - St George-Illawarra Dragons Brisbane Broncos
Lama Tasi - Sydney Roosters
Kevin Walters - Brisbane Broncos and Australian Kangaroos
Kerrod Walters - Brisbane Broncos and Australian Kangaroos
Steven Walters - Canberra Raiders, Queensland State of Origin, Australian Kangaroos
Sam Walker - Sydney Roosters

Rugby Union
Albert Anae - Queensland Red
Berrick Barnes - Queensland Reds and Wallaby Vice Captain New South Wales Waratahs
Nic Berry - Queensland Reds
Herbert Bullmore, Scotland (also grandfather of Kerry Packer)
Rodney Davies - Queensland Reds #1231, Australia 7s
Eric Francis - Ipswich's first Wallaby #140, Queensland #347
Tu Tamarua - Played in Europe and represented the Pacific Islanders team
David Wilson - World Cup and Bledisloe winning Wallaby flanker

Tennis
Roy Emerson - International Tennis Hall of Fame inductee; Former record holder for most Grand Slam men's singles titles
Robert Smeets - Australian Open Men's Doubles player

References

Lists of people educated in Queensland by school affiliation
Queensland-related lists